Breakthrough Energy is the umbrella name of several organizations, founded by Bill Gates in 2015, that aim to accelerate innovation in sustainable energy and in other technologies to reduce greenhouse gas emissions. It invests in a variety of startup companies that are attempting to commercialize new concepts such as nuclear fusion, large-capacity batteries to store renewable energy, and microbe-generated biofuels.

History 
At the 2015 United Nations Climate Change Conference in November 2015, Gates announced that a coalition of 28 high net-worth investors from ten countries had committed to the Breakthrough Energy initiative. A complementary initiative of Gates, Mission Innovation, was announced at the same time. 

In December 2016, a group of investors collectively worth  announced more personal commitment to funding the efforts of a  fund "focused on fighting climate change by investing in clean energy innovation." The fund is named Breakthrough Energy Ventures fund.

Strategy 
At its inception, Gates explained, "The renewable technologies we have today, like wind and solar, have made a lot of progress and could be one path to a zero-carbon energy future... But given the scale of the challenge, we need to be exploring many different paths." Breakthrough Energy invests primarily in businesses where the risk of failure is high and the timeframe for return on investment is 20 years. Traditional venture capitalists look for a return on investment in five years, which may not be enough for the special challenges of the energy sector.

Members
The group is spearheaded by Bill Gates, who previously announced a personal $2 billion investment, and includes:

 Jeff Bezos
 Marc Benioff
 Michael Bloomberg
 Richard Branson
 Reid Hoffman
 Jack Ma
 George Soros
 Tom Steyer
 Meg Whitman
 Dani El Zain
 Mark Zuckerberg
 University of California, the sole institutional investor at launch
 Nat Simons
Mukesh Ambani

Criticism
There has been criticism that the coalition was announced too early, before crucial details had been confirmed. At launch, a Gates Foundation spokesman confirmed that investment professionals had yet to be appointed, named investors—other than Gates—had not publicly stated their level of investment and a financial structure had not been confirmed.

Notable projects
Blue Frontier -  a startup developing new air-conditioning technologies 

Verdox — carbon capture. On February 2, 2022, Breakthrough Energy agreed to join an investors syndicate providing $80 million in capital to Verdox, Inc., a startup company attempting to scale a new carbon capture and removal platform developed at the Massachusetts Institute of Technology—one of five carbon capture technology investments the organization would make by the beginning of the following May. The Verdox, Inc. carbon capture design, created by chemical engineers T. Alan Hatton and Sahag Voskian, co-won a $1 million preliminary prize along with Carbfix (co-founded by geochemist Wallace S. Broecker) from an X Prize Foundation contest funded by SpaceX CEO Elon Musk.

Methanol fuel cells (August 2022), conversion of methanol to electricity

Some of the activities include how to connect producers and consumers of green hydrogen.

See also
 Global Apollo Programme

References

 Bundled references

External links
 Official website

2015 in the environment
2015 in Paris
Climate change finance
United Nations climate change conferences
Renewable energy commercialization
Sustainable energy
Bill Gates